Agra College is an government aided college, which is one of the oldest institutions of higher education in India. Pandit Gangadhar Shastri, a noted Sanskrit scholar, founded the college in 1823, long before the first university in India was established in 1857.   

The institute was a government college until 1883 when a board of trustees and a Committee of Management took over administration.  

Since 1927, the college has been affiliated with B.R Ambedkar University.  

The first graduate from Uttar Pradesh and the first law graduate from India both graduated from Agra College. The Faculty of Law of Agra College is the oldest faculty offering law courses which is even older than Government Law College (GLC) in Mumbai, listed as the oldest "law college" in India by the Bar Council of India (BCI). 

In 1882, the college became an aided institution and affiliated itself with Calcutta University. Its affiliation later changed to the University of Allahabad in 1889 and then to Agra University, now Dr. Bhimrao Ambedkar University, in 1927. Today it is a grant-in-aid institution and also runs a few self-financing courses. It was recognized by the University Grants Commission (UGC) Section 2(f) and 12(B) in 1972.

Academics 
The college offers both graduate and postgraduate degrees in the following subjects: Hindi, English, Sanskrit, Philosophy, Political Science, History, Economics, Psychology, Military Studies, Geography, Law, Engineering, Physics, Chemistry, Mathematics, Statistics, Zoology, and Botany. It also offers a one-year diploma in both Mass Communication and Journalism, a degree course in Commerce, B.Ed., BCA, MCA, and Biotechnology under a self-financed scheme. The college also offers PhD programs in the field of arts and sciences.

The college has 242 faculty positions, out of which 185 are permanent faculty under-grant-in-aid and two contract teachers and one from J & K are in place. The majority of faculty members have doctorates in their respective fields, and the college has a teacher-to-student ratio of 1:25. Seven teachers have D.Sc. or D.Litt., 126 have PhDs, and 11 have M.Phil. degrees. The college has 117 administrative staff and 14 technical staff, though there are 223 sanctioned positions in total. The total enrollment of the college is 9,005 undergraduates, 1,960 post-graduates, and 486 PhD students. There are 2,658 students under the self-financing scheme.

The college follows an annual system of examinations. The unit cost of the college is 1449 rupees, excluding salary, and Rs. 6352, including the salary component. The college has 257 total working days and 176 teaching days.

The Faculty of Law offers a three-year LL.B. after graduation in any stream, and the five-year integrated BALLB  course (300 seats) after 10+2 as well as LL.M. The Faculty of Law of this college serves as the Faculty of Law of Dr. B.R. Ambedkar University (Formerly Agra University), and it conducts all university affairs related to law such as moot courts, practicals, and overseeing law exams.

Agra College is located 4 kilometers away from the District & Session Court in Agra, which is helpful in both the training of, and practice of law students.

Campus 
The college is located on Mahatma Gandhi Road, Agra. The buildings have Gothic architecture, symmetrical parapets, and battlements, giving the campus a majestic look. Buildings are spacious and include academic buildings, the library, hostels, a guest house, an auditorium, and administration blocks. It has seven hostels, six for boys and one for girls. The college has taken steps towards computerization. It aims to provide at least one computer to each department. The UGC-funded Network Resource Center houses nine computers with broadband internet connectivity but is insufficient for the use of all students and teachers. 

The college has a health center with a part-time doctor and a compounder, who provide basic medical care to students. In the case of an emergency, students are taken to the nearby hospital, Sarojani Naidu Medical College (SNMC) and Hospital, which is one of the oldest medical schools in India. The college campus has a branch of Canara Bank which collects fees and maintains the accounts of staff members.

The central library is located in a building measuring 1,585 sq. metres. The library holds more than 140,250 books, out of which 60,000 are textbooks. The library has a collection of rare books. The library also has a textbook bank from which a student can borrow up to four books. The college subscribes to some national journals and periodicals.

The latest editions of some textbooks, reference books, and journals are kept in some departments for the convenience of the staff and students. The central library is equipped with xerographic facilities. The library has a spacious reading hall, stack rooms, and a reference section for postgraduate students. There are separate cubicles for teachers and research scholars. It has been suggested that the library be reorganized and computerized. In addition, it has been suggested that the stacks have open access for the students. The Library can also subscribe to INFLIBNET of the UGC for making online journals available to the staff and students.

The college has very good sports facilities, including fields for outdoor sports like cricket, tennis, football, volleyball, basketball, and various Indian games. There are also facilities for indoor games like table tennis and badminton. The playground has a boundary wall. College athletes in various sports have good track records at state and national events. Several students have participated in inter-university tournaments. A few students have been selected to play at the national level. There is a guest house for the teams who come to participate in various sports events.

Notable alumni 

 Ajit Doval, fifth National Security Adviser of India
 Bhagwan Singh, former High Commissioner in Fiji
 Charan Singh, former Prime Minister of India
 Sir Chhotu Ram, Unionist leader in the pre-independence era
 Moti Lal Nehru, lawyer & President of the Indian National Congress
 Raj Babbar, film actor and politician
 Dr. Shankar Dayal Sharma, former President of India
 G. Taru Sharma, N-Bios laureate

Notes

References

1823 establishments in India
Colleges in Uttar Pradesh
Educational institutions established in 1823
Universities and colleges in Agra